Navali may refer to:

 Navali, Gangavathi, a village in Gangavathi taluk, Koppal district, Karnataka, India
 Navali, Lingasugur, a village in Lingasugur taluk, Raichur district, Karnataka, India
 Navali, Mandsaur, a village in Bhanpura tehsil, Mandsaur district, Madhya Pradesh, India
Navali is village in panhala taluka, Dist. Kolhapur, Maharashtra, India.

See also 
 Navalli, a village in Dharwad district, Karnataka, India
 Navaly, a town in the Jaffna District of Sri Lanka